Ptení is a municipality and village in Prostějov District in the Olomouc Region of the Czech Republic. It has about 1,100 inhabitants.

Administrative parts
Villages of Holubice and Ptenský Dvorek are administrative parts of Ptení.

References

Villages in Prostějov District